Saddle Mountain is a mountain in Butte County, Idaho, located in the Lemhi Range. At 3296m, it is the 18th tallest peak in Idaho with at least 500m of topographical prominence.

References 

Mountains of Idaho
Mountains of Butte County, Idaho